Diogo may refer to:

Diogo (name), a list of people with the given name or surname

Diogo Antunes de Oliveira (born 1986), Brazilian footballer
Diogo Castro (born 1985), Brazilian futsal and football player
Diogo, Constable of Portugal (1425–1443), Portuguese royal prince
Diogo da Costa Oliveira (born 1988), Brazilian footballer
Diogo, Duke of Viseu (1450–1484), Portuguese noble
Diogo Luís Santo (born 1987), Brazilian footballer
Diogo (Mozambican footballer), Mozambican footballer
Diogo Pinheiro (born 1990), Brazilian footballer

Places
Diogo Island, in the Philippines Luzon Volcanic Arc
Diogo, Senegal

See also

Diego (disambiguation)
James (disambiguation)
Santiago (disambiguation)